Kim Kum-sil (born 24 December 1970) is a North Korean politician and former women's international footballer; she played as a midfielder. She was a member of the North Korea women's national football team. She was part of the team at the 1999 FIFA Women's World Cup. She holds the title of Merited Athlete.

Kim is a member of parliament in North Korea's Supreme People's Assembly (SPA). She was elected to the SPA from the 233th Electoral District in the 2009 North Korean parliamentary election and from the 278th (Nyongbyon) in 2014 and 2019.

References

1970 births
Living people
North Korean women's footballers
North Korea women's international footballers
Place of birth missing (living people)
1999 FIFA Women's World Cup players
Women's association football midfielders
Footballers at the 1990 Asian Games
Footballers at the 1998 Asian Games
Asian Games silver medalists for North Korea
Asian Games bronze medalists for North Korea
Asian Games medalists in football
21st-century North Korean women politicians
21st-century North Korean politicians
Members of the Supreme People's Assembly
Medalists at the 1990 Asian Games
Medalists at the 1998 Asian Games